Konidela may refer to:

 Konidela, Kurnool district is a village in Andhra Pradesh, India.
 Konidela (surname)
 Konidela Production Company, an Indian film production company